So Where Are You? is the second album released by the English R&B band Loose Ends. It reached number 13 in the UK in 1985. It features the hits, "Magic Touch" and a cover of David Bowie's "Golden Years". The hit single "Hangin' on a String (Contemplating)", which had appeared on the U.S. edition of the previous album, A Little Spice, is also featured here. It also makes an appearance in popular video game Grand Theft Auto IV's fictional Soul/R&B radio station The Vibe 98.8. The album was not released in the   United States.

Track listing

Charts

Singles

References

External links

1985 albums
Loose Ends (band) albums